Tyrone Hill (born March 19, 1968) is an American former professional basketball player and former assistant coach for the National Basketball Association's Atlanta Hawks. Hill spent four years playing collegiately at Xavier University, in his last season averaging 20.2 points and 12.6 rebounds per game, while shooting 58.1% from the field. The Golden State Warriors selected him with the eleventh pick of the 1990 NBA draft.

After three years in Golden State, Hill was traded to the Cleveland Cavaliers in the summer of 1993. On November 25, 1994, Hill scored 25 points, grabbed 16 rebounds, and recorded seven assists while leading the Cavaliers to a 96–94 win over the Washington Bullets. Playing under Mike Fratello, Hill earned an All-Star Game appearance in 1995. He set Cleveland's single-season franchise record by shooting a career-best 60.0% from the field (and ranked second in the NBA). Hill was sent to the Milwaukee Bucks in a 1997 three-team deal involving notably Terrell Brandon and Shawn Kemp, and after his Bucks tenure spent the remainder of his career between the Philadelphia 76ers, Cleveland (2 stints; 1993–94 to 1996–97 and 2001–02 to 2002–03), and the Miami Heat.

As the starting power forward for Philadelphia, Hill teamed up with Theo Ratliff and later with Dikembe Mutombo with whom he played in the 2001 NBA Finals, losing to the Los Angeles Lakers.  He is frequently referred to as the ultimate "lunch pail and hard hat" player, due to his rugged style of play and relentless defense and rebounding prowess.

Hill had a career field-goal shooting percentage of 50.2 and free-throw percentage of 63.

Tyrone also owned a Cincinnati, Ohio-based record company called All Net Records and released various singles and albums by groups including OTR Clique, D'Meka, Renaizzance, and KompoZur.

NBA career statistics

Regular season 

|-
| style="text-align:left;"| 
| style="text-align:left;"|Golden State
| 74 || 22 || 16.1 || .492 || – || .632 || 5.2 || .3 || .4 || .4 || 5.3
|-
| style="text-align:left;"| 
| style="text-align:left;"|Golden State
| 82 || 75 || 23.0 || .522 || .000 || .694 || 7.2 || .6 || .9 || .5 || 8.2
|-
| style="text-align:left;"| 
| style="text-align:left;"|Golden State
| 74 || 66 || 28.0 || .508 || .000 || .624 || 10.2 || .9 || .6 || .5 || 8.6
|-
| style="text-align:left;"| 
| style="text-align:left;"|Cleveland
| 57 || 20 || 25.4 || .543 || .000 || .668 || 8.8 || .8 || .9 || .6 || 10.6
|-
| style="text-align:left;"| 
| style="text-align:left;"|Cleveland
| 70 || 67 || 34.2 || .504 || .000 || .662 || 10.9 || .8 || .8 || .6 || 13.8
|-
| style="text-align:left;"| 
| style="text-align:left;"|Cleveland
| 44 || 2 || 21.1 || .512 || – || .600 || 5.5 || .8 || .7 || .5 || 7.8
|-
| style="text-align:left;"| 
| style="text-align:left;"|Cleveland
| 74 || 70 || 34.9 || .600 || .000 || .633 || 9.9 || 1.2 || .9 || .4 || 12.9
|-
| style="text-align:left;"| 
| style="text-align:left;"|Milwaukee
| 57 || 56 || 36.2 || .498 || .000 || .608 || 10.7 || 1.5 || 1.2 || .5 || 10.0
|-
| style="text-align:left;"| 
| style="text-align:left;"|Milwaukee
| 17 || 17 || 30.4 || .424 || – || .568 || 7.9 || 1.0 || 1.1 || .5 || 8.6
|-
| style="text-align:left;"| 
| style="text-align:left;"|Philadelphia
| 21 || 6 || 28.0 || .480 || – || .507 || 7.3 || .9 || .8 || .4 || 8.5
|-
| style="text-align:left;"| 
| style="text-align:left;"|Philadelphia
| 68 || 65 || 31.7 || .485 || .000 || .691 || 9.2 || .8 || .9 || .4 || 12.0
|-
| style="text-align:left;"| 
| style="text-align:left;"|Philadelphia
| 76 || 75 || 31.1 || .474 || .000 || .630 || 9.0 || .6 || .5 || .4 || 9.6
|-
| style="text-align:left;"| 
| style="text-align:left;"|Cleveland
| 26 || 26 || 31.2 || .390 || .000 || .650 || 10.5 || .9 || .7 || .5 || 8.0
|-
| style="text-align:left;"| 
| style="text-align:left;"|Cleveland
| 32 || 25 || 26.7 || .431 || – || .733 || 8.3 || 1.0 || 1.0 || .6 || 6.3
|-
| style="text-align:left;"| 
| style="text-align:left;"|Philadelphia
| 24 || 18 || 20.7 || .404 || – || .600 || 5.2 || .4 || .6 || .3 || 4.5
|-
| style="text-align:left;"| 
| style="text-align:left;"|Miami
| 5 || 0 || 7.6 || .600 || – || .750 || 1.6 || .0 || .0 || .2 || 1.8
|- class="sortbottom"
| style="text-align:center;" colspan="2"| Career
| 801 || 610 || 28.0 || .502 || .000 || .643 || 8.6 || .8 || .8 || .5 || 9.4
|- class="sortbottom"
| style="text-align:center;" colspan="2"| All-Star
| 1 || 0 || 6.0 || 1.000 || – || – || 4.0 || .0 || – || – || 2.0

Playoffs 

|-
|style="text-align:left;"|1991
|style="text-align:left;”|Golden State
|9||0||8.9||.643||.000||.667||2.6||.2||.3||.4||2.4
|-
|style="text-align:left;"|1992
|style="text-align:left;”|Golden State
|4||1||11.8||.429||–||.000||2.0||.3||.5||.0||1.5
|-
|style="text-align:left;"|1994
|style="text-align:left;”|Cleveland
|3||3||41.0||.407||–||.541||10.3||1.3||.3||.3||14.0
|-
|style="text-align:left;"|1995
|style="text-align:left;”|Cleveland
|4||4||34.8||.310||.000||.640||5.8||.8||1.8||.3||8.5
|-
|style="text-align:left;"|1996
|style="text-align:left;”|Cleveland
|3||0||17.7||.750||–||.778||5.0||.0||.0||.0||8.3
|-
|style="text-align:left;"|1999
|style="text-align:left;”|Philadelphia
|8||1||24.5||.487||–||.368||7.4||.0||.4||.3||5.6
|-
|style="text-align:left;"|2000
|style="text-align:left;”|Philadelphia
|10||10||35.2||.460||.000||.705||9.7||.9||.9||.1||12.3
|-
|style="text-align:left;"|2001
|style="text-align:left;”|Philadelphia
|23||23||32.3||.409||.000||.679||7.3||.4||.6||.5||7.2
|-
|style="text-align:left;"|2003
|style="text-align:left;”|Philadelphia
|10||0||14.1||.632||–||1.000||2.8||.2||.1||.1||2.8
|- class="sortbottom"
| style="text-align:center;" colspan="2"| Career
| 74 || 42 || 25.3 || .451 || .000 || .628 || 6.1 || .4 || .5 || .3 || 6.6

See also
List of NCAA Division I men's basketball players with 2000 points and 1000 rebounds

References

External links

Career statistics at Basketball-reference.com

1968 births
Living people
African-American basketball coaches
African-American basketball players
American men's basketball players
Atlanta Hawks assistant coaches
Basketball players from Cincinnati
Cleveland Cavaliers players
Golden State Warriors draft picks
Golden State Warriors players
Miami Heat players
Milwaukee Bucks players
National Basketball Association All-Stars
Philadelphia 76ers players
Power forwards (basketball)
Xavier Musketeers men's basketball players
21st-century African-American people
20th-century African-American sportspeople